is a Japanese badminton novel series written by Asami Koseki. Poplar Publishing have published four volumes between May 2011 and March 2014 under their Poplar Bunko Pureful imprint. An anime television series adaptation by Nippon Animation and OLM aired from April to September 2022. A manga adaptation with art by Dam Miyata was serialized online via Shueisha's Tonari no Young Jump manga website from April to October of the same year.

Characters

Media

Novels

Anime
An anime television series adaptation was announced on August 7, 2021. The series is animated by Nippon Animation and OLM and directed by Hiroshi Takeuchi, with Tomoko Konparu handling series' composition, Riko Kaneda designing the characters, and Yuki Hayashi composing the series' music. It aired from April 2 to September 24, 2022, on ytv, NTV, and other channels. Say! Say! Crunchyroll has licensed the series outside of Asia. Medialink licensed the series in Southeast Asia, South Asia, and Oceania minus Australia and New Zealand.

Episode list

Manga
A manga adaptation with art by Dam Miyata was serialized online via Shueisha's Tonari no Young Jump website from April 8, 2022, to October 28, 2022. It has been collected in two tankōbon volumes.

Reception

Previews
Anime News Network had five editors review the first episode of the anime: Caitlin Moore was positive towards the "smooth and glossy" animation having lifelike detail but was critical of the grounded storytelling that utilized a slow pace and less badminton scenes; Richard Eisenbeis praised the "solid human drama" surrounding Ryo's young adult life but felt the "bog-standard" ending with the cliché teammates lowered his excitement; James Beckett critiqued that the episode had nothing for casual viewers outside of its given sport, criticizing Ryo's introductory arc for being boring and utilizing a "chintzy soundtrack" to emphasize forced dramatics throughout the story; Nicholas Dupree observed that it followed the "average high-school sports show" formula but came across as "an uncomfortably stiff and empty start" to the show with dull character interactions and badminton scenes, concluding that he would "rather watch a match than sit through another episode of Love All Play going through the motions." The fifth reviewer, Rebecca Silverman, praised the episode for highlighting Ryo's interactions with his friends and family about his sport recommendation but noted that the "introductory nature" will require viewers to watch another episode or two to see how much they will enjoy it, concluding that "there's nothing overtly wrong with this episode even if there's nothing overtly right either, and if you're hankering for some boys playing sports in shorts, this very well might fit the bill."

Series reception
Silverman reviewed the first half of the series and gave it a B– grade. She praised the cast's "facial expressions" for making them distinct from each other (singling out identical twins Taichi and Youji), their interactions in and out of the sport and Ebihara being an "attentive coach", but found the overall plot "fairly cookie-cutter" with "rushed and choppy" pacing during its tournaments and a lack of focus on badminton, concluding that: "While it may not be the hot-blooded sports action some viewers are looking for, it is a perfectly decent series, and certainly one that's good enough to hang on to for a second cour." Silverman chose Love All Play as her pick for the Worst Anime of 2022, writing: "It seemed oddly reluctant for a sports show to actually show, you know, sports. It had its moments, but not enough of them, and it's one of the few times I have thought I would really like to get back the hours I invested."

Notes

References

External links
  
 

2011 Japanese novels
2022 anime television series debuts
Anime and manga based on novels
Badminton mass media
Book series introduced in 2011
Crunchyroll anime
Japanese webcomics
Medialink
Nippon Animation
Nippon TV original programming
OLM, Inc.
Seinen manga
Shueisha manga
Sports anime and manga
Webcomics in print
Yomiuri Telecasting Corporation original programming